The 1934 Kategoria e Dytë is the fourth season of the second tier of football in Albania. The league began in April and finished on 24 June 1934 and it was divided into 2 groups, with the winners of Group A and B playing each other in the final. The final was played between Shqiponja Gjirokastër and Vetëtima Himarë, which Shqiponja Gjirokastër won 3-0. Despite winning the league Shqiponja Gjirokastër were not promoted as there was no Albanian National Championship played in 1935, and as the club did not register for the 1936 season they were replaced by Dragoj Pogradec.

Group A

Shqiponja Gjirokastër won the group

Group B

Vetëtima Himarë won the group

Final

Match was suspended after 81 minutes

References

Kategoria e Parë seasons
Albania
2